Alamance Mill Village Historic District is a national historic district located at Alamance, Alamance County, North Carolina. It encompasses 18 contributing buildings and 1 contributing structure built between 1840 and 1947 in Alamance.  The district includes 15 mill houses, a warehouse, and the mill dam and connected remains of the head race.

It was added to the National Register of Historic Places in 2007.

References

Historic districts on the National Register of Historic Places in North Carolina
Historic districts in Alamance County, North Carolina
National Register of Historic Places in Alamance County, North Carolina